The statue of Mary McLeod Bethune in Jersey City, New Jersey is located in the Greenville section. It honors the educator and civil rights leader Mary McLeod Bethune (1875 – 1955).

It was dedicated on November 22, 2021 and marked the completion the namesake Bethune Park, which opened in August 2021, and is across the from the Bethune Center on Martin Luther King Drive.

The statue was designed by Alvin Petit who said of the work: “As a broader significance, this also plays a role in linking our City with a national movement to erect monuments that symbolize diversity and inclusiveness. This will be the first statue in Jersey City to honor the legacy of an African American woman.”

The inscription reads:

DR. MARY McCLEOD BETHUNE
July 10, 1875 – May 18, 1955
EDUCATOR * STATEWOMEN * ACTIVIST * ENTREPRENEUR
"If we have the courage and tenacity of our
forebears who stood firmly like a rock against
the lash of slavery, we shall find a way to do
for our day what they did for theirs."

See also
 List of public art in Jersey City, New Jersey
 Statue of Mary McLeod Bethune (disambiguation)
 Mary McLeod Bethune Memorial

References

External links
Inscription of statue

Mary McLeod Bethune
Public art in Jersey City, New Jersey
Culture of Jersey City, New Jersey
Outdoor sculptures in New Jersey
Monuments and memorials in New Jersey
2021 sculptures
Buildings and structures in Jersey City, New Jersey
Tourist attractions in Jersey City, New Jersey
Statues in New Jersey
Sculptures of women in New Jersey
2021 establishments in New Jersey
African-American history of New Jersey
Sculptures of African Americans